Miracle Mile may refer to:

Places in the United States 

 Miracle Mile, Los Angeles, California, a district of Los Angeles
 Miracle Mile (Coral Gables), a shopping area in Coral Gables, Florida
 Miracle Mile (Manhasset), New York, a premium shopping district on the North Shore of Long Island
 Miracle Mile Shops in the Planet Hollywood Resort and Casino in Las Vegas, Nevada
 Miracle Mile, a shopping area in Stockton, California
 Miracle Mile, a shopping area in St. Louis Park, Minnesota
 "Miracle Mile", South Main Street in Fond du Lac, Wisconsin, so named for a string of lottery-winning tickets sold there
 Miracle Mile Road, the southernmost alignment of Arizona State Route 77
 Miracle Mile Historic District, Tucson, Arizona
 "Miracle Mile", Red Hill Avenue, connecting San Rafael and San Anselmo, California

Music

Albums
 Miracle Mile (Guardian album), 1993
 Miracle Mile (Latch Key Kid album), 2008
 Miracle Mile (Strfkr album), 2013
 Miracle Mile (Wayne Horvitz album), 1992
 Miracle Mile (soundtrack), by Tangerine Dream, from the 1988 film (see below)
 The Miracle Mile, by Kevin Hearn and Thin Buckle, 2006

Songs
 "Miracle Mile"  (song), by Cold War Kids, 2013
 "Miracle Mile", by Down with Webster from Down with Webster
 "Miracle Mile", by Icehouse from Code Blue
 "Miracle Mile", by Soul Asylum from While You Were Out

Other uses 
 Miracle Mile (film), a 1988 apocalyptic thriller cult film
 Miracle Mile Pace, an annual harness race in Sydney, New South Wales, Australia
 "Miracle Mile", a race between Roger Bannister and John Landy at the 1954 British Empire and Commonwealth Games

See also 
 Magnificent Mile, a neighborhood in Chicago, Illinois, US
 Millionaires' Mile, an informal name given to exclusive residential neighborhoods of various cities